{{Infobox Boxingmatch
|fight date    = May 5, 2012
|Fight Name    = Ring Kings
|image         = 
|location      = MGM Grand Garden Arena, Paradise, Nevada, U.S.
|fighter1      = Floyd Mayweather Jr.
|nickname1     = Money
|record1       = 42–0 (26 KO)
|hometown1     = Las Vegas, Nevada, U.S.
|height1       = 5 ft 8 in
|Referee       = 
|weight1       = 151 lb
|recognition1  = WBC welterweight champion[[The Ring (magazine)|The Ring]] No. 2 ranked pound-for-pound fighter5-division world champion
|fighter2      = Miguel Cotto
|nickname2     = Junito
|record2       = 37–2 (30 KO)
|hometown2     = Caguas, Puerto Rico
|height2       = 5 ft 8 in
|weight2       = 154 lb
|recognition2  = WBA (Super) super welterweight champion3-division world champion
|titles        = WBA (Super) super welterweight title
|result        =  Mayweather Jr. wins via 12-round unanimous decision (117-111, 117-111, 118-110)
}}
Floyd Mayweather Jr. vs. Miguel Cotto, billed as Ring Kings'', was a boxing super welterweight bout held on May 5, 2012, at the MGM Grand Garden Arena in Las Vegas, Nevada, United States. Mayweather won the fight by unanimous decision in what was deemed to be a clear, but very competitive and exciting victory for Floyd.

Drug Testing 
Both fighters agreed to random blood and urine testing for the fight, which Mayweather had demanded of his most recent opponents at the time.

Background

Mayweather 

There was immediate speculation as to whom Mayweather would fight. Many felt that he should fight eight division champion, Manny Pacquiao. Indeed Mayweather called out Pacquiao via Twitter. Negotiations for the fight hit the wall, however, when there were arguments over the venue and how the money from the fight should be split.

Mayweather has had one previous fight in the 154-pound division, which was when he outpointed Oscar De La Hoya to win a belt in May 2007.

Mayweather reclaimed one of his old welterweight titles by knocking out Victor Ortiz controversially in the fourth round at the MGM Grand on Sept. 17, 2011.

Cotto 
Making the third defense of his title, Cotto was in a fight without Top Rank as his promoter for the first time in his career. His contract with Bob Arum's company expired following his Dec. 3 revenge, 10th-round knockout victory against Antonio Margarito and he will be working with Golden Boy Promotions, Top Rank's archrival, on the fight with Mayweather.

Reported fight earnings
Floyd Mayweather Jr. guaranteed $45 million vs. Miguel Angel Cotto $8 million
Shane Mosley $750,000 vs. Canelo Álvarez $2 million
The fight drew 1.5 Million pay per view buys.

Main card
Super Welterweight Championship bout:  Floyd Mayweather vs.  Miguel Cotto (c)
Mayweather wins by UD with scores of 118-110 and 117-111 twice.

Super Welterweight Championship bout:  Canelo Álvarez (c) vs.  Shane Mosley
Alvarez wins by UD with scores of 119-109 twice and 118-110.

Light Welterweight bout:  Jessie Vargas vs  Steve Forbes
Vargas wins by UD with scores of 100-90,  98-92 and 97-93.

Super Welterweight bout:  Deandre Latimore vs  Carlos Quintana
Quintana wins by KO (6)

Preliminary card
Welterweight bout:  Keith Thurman vs   Brandon Hoskins
Thurman wins by TKO (3)

Featherweight bout:  Braulio Santos vs   Juan Sandoval
Lightweight bout:  Jeffrey Fontanez vs  Benna Acaba
Lightweight bout:  Omar Figueroa vs  Robbie Cannon
Welterweight bout:  Antonio Orozco vs  Dillet Frederick

International broadcasting

Notes

External links
Floyd Mayweather vs. Miguel Cotto Official Fight Card from BoxRec
Mayweather vs Cotto Tale of the Tape

Cotto
2012 in boxing
Boxing in Las Vegas
2012 in sports in Nevada
Boxing on HBO
Golden Boy Promotions
May 2012 sports events in the United States
MGM Grand Garden Arena